Rock Hopping is an activity involving jumping from rock to rock. The most common form of this activity is probably traveling up a boulder-filled stream or brook by jumping from rock to rock, while avoiding falling in. Another common site for rock hopping is boulder fields. Rock hopping can be used as a means of getting from one place to another in combination with scrambling over rocks for the purpose of outdoor activity such as rock climbing. It has also become an extreme sport whereby participants jump over large gaps, sometimes without any form of safety device such as a securing rope to ensure they do not fall and injure themselves or worse.

References

Types of climbing